David Maxwell Kirschner (born May 29, 1955) is an American film & television producer and screenwriter. His producing credits include Don Bluth's An American Tail and Titan A.E. animated features (also wrote)  as well as the Child's Play horror film series.

Career 
After studying at the University of Southern California School of Cinematic Arts, Kirschner began his career designing album cover art for Neil Diamond, most notably Neil Diamond's The Jazz Singer, and illustrating characters for the Muppets and Sesame Street. In 1983, Kirschner created and released children's book series Rose Petal Place, which spawned two Television specials, toys, clothing, and a wide array of licensed consumer products. In 1986, Kirschner created and executive produced An American Tail, which was co-executive produced by Steven Spielberg, and, at its release, was the highest-grossing non-Disney produced animated feature of all time. It was followed by its theatrical sequel An American Tail: Fievel Goes West (1991), the television series Fievel's American Tails, and two direct-to-video sequels. In 1986, David Kirschner signed a deal with United Artists Pictures and MGM/UA Television for development, production and distribution of major motion picture and television projects for a two-year deal. Kirschner was appointed chairman of Hanna-Barbera Productions in 1989, where he wrote / created and executive produced many films, specials and shows, including Wake, Rattle & Roll, Gravedale High and The Pirates of Dark Water.

Kirschner is also creator of the Chucky animatronic doll which is featured in the Chucky series. He has produced all seven films in the original franchise, including the recent Curse of Chucky and Cult of Chucky, direct-to-video films made by Universal 1440 Entertainment. Other notable productions include 1997's Cats Don't Dance, winner of the 25th annual Annie Award for Best Animated Feature, 2006's Curious George, based upon the book series of the same name, Martian Child, and Golden Globe-nominated Miss Potter. His 2010s/2020s work includes executive producer on Curious George, Hocus Pocus 2 (Disney+), Cult of Chucky (for Universal 1440 Entertainment), Random (In Pre-Production for The Weinstein Company) and Garden District (In-Development for Dimension Films). Kirschner is currently head of his own production company, David Kirschner Productions.

Filmography

References

External links 
 

1955 births
American animated film producers
American illustrators
American film producers
American male screenwriters
American male writers
American television producers
Animation screenwriters
Film producers from California
Hanna-Barbera people
Living people